Chrystkowo  is a village in the administrative district of Gmina Świecie, within Świecie County, Kuyavian-Pomeranian Voivodeship, in north-central Poland.

Chrystkowo was established in the 17th century by a Mennonite community. The Mennonites in this period were settling in the lower Vistula valley and Żuławy region escaping persecution in Western Europe. There is a well-preserved wooden Mennonite house from 1770 in the village. Chrystkowo currently has a population of 170.

Notable residents
 Paul Boldt (1885-1921), German poet

References

Chrystkowo